Busking is a form of public entertainment also known as street performance.

Busking may also refer to:

Busking (U.S. case law)
Busking, an album by Mike Doughty
Busking, an album by Jon English
Busking Day